John Wright (4 February 1873 – 1946) was a Scottish footballer who played in the Football League for Bolton Wanderers and The Wednesday, and the Southern League for Plymouth Argyle, Watford and Southend United. He was an inside forward.

Career
Wright was born in Hamilton. He began his career with Hamilton Academical and played for Motherwell during their first Scottish Football League campaign before returning to Hamilton (who had yet to join the SFL). He then moved to Clyde, where he made 18 league appearances and scored four goals.

Wright switched to English football when he joined Bolton Wanderers in June 1895, and played regularly in his first three seasons with the club. He was transferred to The Wednesday in November 1898 having scored 14 league goals in 85 games for Bolton. In his second season with Wednesday (1899–1900), Wright was the club's leading goalscorer and received a Football League Second Division winner's medal. He scored 42 goals in 103 league appearances for Wednesday (and 110 and 43 including FA Cup ties).

He returned to Hamilton in September 1902 and then re-signed with Bolton the following month. In two more seasons with the club, Wright played in 34 league games and scored five times. Wright left the club in May 1904 and joined Plymouth Argyle, where he won the Western League First Division title in his second season. A club handbook states that Wright was "always clever, frequently brilliant and has never been known to play a bad game." He made 110 appearances for Argyle in all competitions and scored 17 goals before moving to Watford in May 1907. Wright played in 27 league games without scoring and then joined Southend United in May 1908.

In two seasons with Southend, he scored ten goals in 56 league appearances. Wright became the club's reserve team trainer in 1913 and went on to coach in the local area. Wright died in Southend-on-Sea in 1946.

Personal life
He had two sons who were also footballers: Billy Wright played for Bolton and for Reading; Doug Wright played mainly for Newcastle United and Lincoln City, and was capped by England in 1938.

Honours
Football League Second Division: 1899–1900
Western League First Division: 1904–05

References

1873 births
Footballers from Hamilton, South Lanarkshire
Scottish footballers
Association football forwards
Hamilton Academical F.C. players
Motherwell F.C. players
Clyde F.C. players
Bolton Wanderers F.C. players
Sheffield Wednesday F.C. players
Plymouth Argyle F.C. players
Watford F.C. players
Southend United F.C. players
Scottish Football League players
English Football League players
Southern Football League players
Western Football League players
1946 deaths
Southend United F.C. non-playing staff